The Northumbrian Renaissance or Northumbria's Golden Age is the name given to a period of cultural flowering in the Anglo-Saxon kingdom of Northumbria, broadly speaking from the mid-seventh to the mid-eighth centuries. It is characterised by a blend of insular art, Germanic art and Mediterranean influence. Authors associated with this golden age include Bede and Alcuin; artefacts include the Lindisfarne Gospels and associated manuscripts, the Ruthwell Cross and associated sculptures, and, arguably, the Franks Casket. An illustration of the cultural activity of Northumbria during this period is given by Alcuin's De Sanctis et Pontificibus Ecclesiæ Eboracensis, which gives particular attention to Bishop Æthelbert of York.

See also
History of Northumberland
Timeline of Northumbria and Northumberland

References
Blair, P. Hunter (1976) Northumbria in the Days of Bede. London: Gollancz
Hawkes, Jane & Mills, S. (eds.) (1999) Northumbria's Golden Age
Neuman de Vegvar, Carol L. (1987) The Northumbrian Renaissance: a study in the transmission of style. Cranbury: Associated University Presses 
Nordhagen, Per Jonas (1994) 'The Codex Amiatinus and the Byzantine Element in the Northumbrian Renaissance',  in Various authors, Bede and his world: the Jarrow lectures, with a preface by Michael Lapidge. 2 vols. Aldershot: Variorum; Vol. 1, pp. 435–62
Orton, F. (2004) 'Northumbrian identity in the eighth century: the Ruthwell and Bewcastle monuments; style, classification, class, and the form of ideology', Journal of Medieval and Early Modern Studies, 34:1 (2004) 95-145

Further reading
Hawkes, Jane (1996) The Golden Age of Northumbria. Morpeth: Sandhill Press; Newcastle upon Tyne: Tyne & Wear Museums (Published to accompany an exhibition entitled: Treasures from the Lost Kingdom of Northumbria)
Neuman de Vegvar, Carol L. (1981) The Northumbrian Golden Age: parameters of a renaissance. Ph.D. thesis, University of Pennsylvania

Northumbria
Golden ages (metaphor)